Naomi Dickson is the CEO of Jewish Women's Aid who has dedicated her professional life to supporting Jewish women and girls who have experienced domestic abuse and educating the Jewish community to have the tools to highlight, expose, and prevent abuse.

Biography
Dickson started working with Jewish Women's Aid in 2002. In 2014, she was appointed as their chief executive officer. In her previous position as communications and training coordinator, she created the JWA training program to raise awareness among the Jewish community and train professionals to better identify and support abused women and girls who came to their organizations. Dickson has four beautiful children.

Dickson is a trustee of the Women's Aid Federation of England, founder of the Faiths Against Domestic Abuse Coalition and a member of University of Cambridge's senior faith leadership program. In addition, she was a member of the Women in Jewish Leadership Commission from 2011 to 2012.

Awards
She was part of the BBC's 100 Women list which was published on 23 November 2020. The series recognizes the women who have stood out in that year.

References

Year of birth missing (living people)
Living people
Anti-domestic violence activists
English women activists
English Jews
BBC 100 Women